Alfred H. Peet (March 10, 1920 – August 29, 2007) was a Dutch-American entrepreneur and the founder of Peet's Coffee & Tea in Berkeley, California, in 1966. Peet is widely credited with starting the specialty coffee revolution in the US. Among coffee historians, Peet has been called "the Dutchman who taught America how to drink coffee." Peet taught his style of roasting beans to Jerry Baldwin, Zev Siegl and Gordon Bowker, who, with his blessing, took the technique to Seattle and founded Starbucks in 1971. Peet later distanced himself, however, from the Starbucks trio as they experimented with ultra-dark roasts. "Baldwin never learned anything from me," Peet was later quoted as saying.

Life and career
Peet was born in Alkmaar, The Netherlands, where his father ran a small coffee roasting establishment, prior to World War II. Following the war; Peet left London, where he had apprenticed with Twinings coffee and tea company, to work as a tea taster in the Dutch East Indies and New Zealand, prior to emigrating to San Francisco, California, in 1955, where he worked in the coffee importing industry.

Dismayed with the poor quality of coffee in the United States, Peet opened a coffee store in Berkeley, California, on 1 April 1966. He compared the low quality coffee in the United States to World War II "rationed" coffee.

Although often encouraged to expand the business, he remained stalwart in keeping the original location at Walnut and Vine, zealously guarding the quality of the coffee bearing his name. After several years of roasting beans in the back of the store using one-, and then five-pound, roasters, in the early 1970s, he acquired a  warehouse in the adjacent town of Emeryville, in which he installed a 100-pound roaster, followed by a 300-pound roaster, in 1976. By that time, Peet had two additional retail stores: one on Piedmont in Oakland, and one on University in Palo Alto. He then also sold roasted-to-order, 20 to 50 pound bags of  beans to restaurants throughout the Bay Area.

Retirement
Peet sold his business, in 1979, to Sal Bonavita, for whom he remained a mentor for the next five years. Bonavita soon opened new stores in Oakland, Mill Valley and Menlo Park. After retiring from the coffee business, Peet moved in 2001 to Ashland, Oregon, where he died on August 29, 2007, at age 87. In 1984, Jerry Baldwin led Starbucks in acquiring Peet's four locations from Bonavita.

Influence on coffee industry
Peet introduced custom coffee roasting of top quality beans to the United States, at a time when Americans were typically drinking coffee brewed from beans freeze-dried in a can.

The origin of Berkeley's Gourmet Ghetto was Peet's first Peet's Coffee location, opened in 1966, at the corner of Walnut and Vine; the area grew around Peet's and adjacent specialty food, health food, and other avant-garde restaurants that sprung up, including Chez Panisse.

While Peet was known to have a "severe demeanor", he also had a genuine willingness to instruct coffee entrepreneurs in the art of bean roasting. Starbucks co-founder Jerry Baldwin has remembered Peet as a "very generous" mentor. And Baldwin was one of many coffee entrepreneurs that Peet mentored, including Jamie Anderson (Anderson's Coffee, Austin, Texas), David Dessinger (Pegasus Coffee, Bainbridge Island, Washington), Arnold Spinelli (Spinelli Coffee Company, San Francisco, California), Susan O'Hori (O'Hori's Coffee Roasters, Santa Fe, New Mexico) and Leigh McDonald (founder of Coffee Connection in Amsterdam).

Other coffee entrepreneurs got into the business simply because they were inspired by Alfred Peet and their experience tasting his coffee at his first Berkeley store. George Howell is a notable example, who founded The Coffee Connection in the Boston, Massachusetts area. Howell is widely credited as having been the inventor of the Frappuccino. Starbucks later acquired his business.

Media
An interview with Alfred Peet is included in the documentary Coffee Culture USA by Kenneth van Schooten and Julie Ragusa, released in 2008.

Peet's sister, then aged 100, was interviewed by Dutch editor and author Jasper Houtman, for The Coffee Visionary: The Life & Legacy of Alfred Peet, published in 2018.

See also
 Gourmet Ghetto

References

External links
 Alfred Peet Memorial (short YouTube video by Peet's Coffee and Tea, posted Mar 4, 2008)

1920 births
2007 deaths
20th-century American businesspeople
20th-century Dutch businesspeople
Dutch emigrants to the United States
People from Alkmaar
People from Ashland, Oregon
Businesspeople in coffee
Businesspeople from the San Francisco Bay Area
Food and drink in the San Francisco Bay Area